Anjirlu may refer to:
 Anjirlu, Bileh Savar, Ardabil Province
 Anjirlu, Germi, Ardabil Province
 Anjirlu Rural District, in Ardabil Province